Scott Paul Kremerskothen (born 5 January 1979) is an Australian former cricketer who played for Tasmania. He plays his club cricket for Clarence District Cricket Club.

Kremerskothen is an all-rounder who bats well in the middle order, and can get the ball to move both ways off the pitch with his medium pace bowling. He was a regular feature in the Tasmania line-up in the early years of the 21st century, however he became yet another victim of the Tasmania's 2006 injury crisis, and missed most of the season.  He has not represented the team since.

External links

1979 births
Living people
Australian cricket coaches
Australian cricketers
Cricketers from Launceston, Tasmania
Tasmania cricketers